The American National Business Hall of Fame (ANBHF) was established in 1972. It is managed by an executive office, and has representatives from universities throughout the United States.  Its laureate program inducts American businesspeople into the ANBHF, based on a combination of exceptional leadership and business ethics.

Selection criteria
For laureate selection criteria, see footnote

Laureates
For an alphabetical list of laureates inducted into the ANBHF, see footnote

Wallace Abbott
Mary Kay Ash
H. H. Barber
William M. Batten
Stephen Bechtel, Sr.
Charles Becker
Olive Ann Beech
William Blackie
Jacob Bunn
Alfred Burdick
Leo Burnett
Andrew Carnegie
William Casey
Gary Comer
Fairfax Cone
John Cotter
G.D. Crain
Frederick C. Crawford
Harry B. Cunningham
Arthur Vining Davis
Charles Deere
John Deere
D. J. DePree
Hugh DePree
Walt Disney
Donald W. Douglas
George Eastman
Thomas A. Edison
Harvey Firestone
Benjamin Franklin
R.J. Frisby
Paul Galvin
Roswell Garst
Parker Gates
William Gore
W. B. Greene
Walter A. Haas
Joyce C. Hall
Ken Hansen
Henry J. Heinz
James G. Hill
Conrad N. Hilton
Wayne Hummer
R. B. Hulsen
Roy Ingersoll
Richard D. Irwin
Kenneth Iverson
Eric Jonsson
James Johnson
John H. Johnson
Robert Wood Johnson I
Robert Wood Johnson II
Henry J. Kaiser
William Karnes
Bernard Kilgore
Dale Kirlin
Robert J. Kleberg
Ray Kroc
Edwin Land
Albert Lasker
James Lincoln
Wesley H. Loomis III
Frances Cabot Lowell
Gust E. Lundberg
Franklin Lunding
Ian MacGregor
Irl Martin
Cyrus McCormick
Robert R. McCormick
Robert Francis McDermott
Eugene McDonald
William Marsteller
George Mecherle
Charles E. Merrill
Joseph L. Miller
George S. Moore
J. Pierpont Morgan
Louis Neumiller
William Norris
David N. Ogilvy
John H. Patterson
William A. Patterson
James Cash Penney
William Cooper Procter
Tom Roberts, Sr.
John D. Rockefeller
Julius Rosenwald
David Sarnoff
John G. Searle
Richard Sears
Alfred P. Sloan
Cyrus R. Smith
Charles Clinton Spaulding
A. E. Staley
W. Clement Stone
John Swearingen
Gustavus F. Swift
Herbert Taylor
David Thomas
Fred Turner
Cornelius Vanderbilt
Marion Wade
Charles Walgreen
Charles R. Walgreen III
DeWitt Wallace
Lila A. Wallace
Sam Moore Walton
Aaron Montgomery Ward
Thomas J. Watson, Jr.
Thomas J. Watson, Sr.
Ken Wessner
George Westinghouse
Frederick Weyerhaeuser
Joseph C. Wilson
Robert E. Wood
Robert W. Woodruff

Fellows
For an alphabetical list of ANBHF fellows, see footnote

Museum
The ANBHF has an online museum.

Board members
For an alphabetical list of board members, see footnote

The ANBHF has a board of directors and a board of state representatives.

References

External links
ANBHF homepage

Business
Awards established in 1972
Businesspeople halls of fame
Organizations based in Columbus, Ohio